Mississauga Truck and Bus Collision is a rebuilder of buses and trucks in Southern Ontario. Located in Milton, Ontario, MTB has done work for various transit authorities in Ontario, Canada and the United States. MTB also rebuilds and resells second hand buses to other agencies:

 Toronto Transit Commission - CNG bus rebuilds and conversion to diesel
 Ajax Pickering Transit Authority
 Mississauga Transit
 Barrie Transit

MTB rebuilds bus and trucks damaged by collisions, fires and other sources of damage. MTB also made Glider kits to agencies using license versions of existing buses builders, such as Orion Bus Industries.

Products

 MTB Glider kit buses (No longer in production)

See also

 Dupont Trolley Industries

References

 MTB website

Bus manufacturers of Canada